Filiberto Hernández Martínez (born 1971) was a Mexican serial killer active between 2010 and 2013. His crimes took place in Tamuín, in southern of San Luis Potosi state, allegedly murdered four children and a woman, before other feminicide was attributed him.

Biography
In 1971, Filiberto Hernández was born in Ebano, San Luis Potosi, to an impoverished family. He had 3 brothers and 2 sisters. According to his father, Marcelino Hernández, he was a normal boy, had worked from a young age, only studied to a high school level, and enlisted in the military when he was 17 years old.

See also
List of serial killers by country

References

1971 births
Living people
Male serial killers
Mexican murderers of children
Mexican people convicted of murder
Mexican rapists
Mexican serial killers
People convicted of murder by Mexico
People from San Luis Potosí